Bongyang station is a railway station in Bongyang, the city of Jecheon. It is on the Jungang Line and the Chungbuk Line.

External links
 Cyber station information from Korail

Railway stations in North Chungcheong Province
Jecheon
Railway stations opened in 1941